East High School is a public high school serving the sixth through twelfth grade in Rochester, N.Y, and is part of the Rochester City School District, and in partnership with the University of Rochester as the school's Educational Partnership Organization (EPO). The school opened in 1902 on 410 Alexander St, and was designed by noted Rochester architect J. Foster Warner. The school was later moved in 1959 to its current location, 1801 East Main Street. Since 2002, changes have occurred, including the re-addition of a junior high and the splitting of the school into separate academies.

Partnership with the University of Rochester
In May 2014, the New York State Education Department granted the University of Rochester's request to take over management of East High School.
Beginning in the 2015-2016 school year, the University will implement a plan in their efforts to "increase learning opportunities" for students.

Schools
East High currently contains two separate schools for their students, each with staggering start times. Their Lower School is for students in grades 6-8 and their Upper School is for students grades 9-12. There is a separate academy for their 9th grade students in the Upper School known as the Freshman Academy.

Lower School
The Lower School, formerly known as the Foundation Academy, is for students in grades 6-8. Their current principal is Leeandrew Wingo. In the Lower School, the students have their own place within the East High building, creating a small school atmosphere. The Lower School currently has around 320 students per grade level, small classes in core subjects, and a focus on college and career readiness and lifelong success.

Upper School
The Upper School is for students in grades 9-12. Their current principal is Marlene Blocker. The school offers a full range of classes leading up to the Regents diploma, including career and technical pathways as well as AP and early-college classes. Some of these career and technical pathways include Culinary Arts, Information Technology, Advanced Manufacturing, Teaching, Business, and Health Related Careers. In addition to all of this, every student in the Upper School will have access to the full range of BOCES programs.

Freshman Academy
The 9th graders in the Upper School have their own wing of the building, with extra support, extended time for math and literacy, and opportunities to complete four or more high school credits. The 9th graders also have their own lunch period, their own PE classes, their own period for Family Group, 4 counselors, 2 social workers, and alternative programs for scholars not on track after the 9th grade. The current director for the Freshman Academy is Ed Mascadri.

Performance
With the AP institute, the school has overcome many challenges. The school offers over 19 AP credit classes which some students partake in. The graduation rate of East High in 2009 was 39%  and as of June 2020 was 74%

Student body/demographics
African American: 50.8% 
Hispanic: 35.4% 
White: 8.1% 
Not Specified: 4.9% 
Two or more races: 0.4% 
American Indian: 0.3%

86.3% of the students at East High School receive a free/reduced lunch rate.

Notable alumni

Kim Batten, 400 meter hurdles champion
Al Butler, NBA basketball player for the Boston Celtics
Midge Costanza, American Presidential advisor, social and political activist
 Walter Dukes, NBA basketball player for the New York Knicks
 Ed Edmondson, former president of the United States Chess Federation
 Lester Harrison, member of the Basketball Hall of Fame
 Mark Jones, NBA basketball player for the New Jersey Nets
 Tony Jordan, NFL running back
 Art Long, NBA basketball player for the Sacramento Kings
 Mitch Miller, American musician
Manuel Rivera-Ortiz, documentary photographer
 Kenneth Rogoff, Professor of Public Policy and Professor of Economics at Harvard University (never graduated)
 Andrei Shleifer, Professor of Economics at Harvard University; John Bates Clark Medal winner
Mark Shulman, American humorist and author of over 100 books for teens and children
Morrie Silver, businessman and minor league baseball executive, member of the International League Hall of Fame
 Hanna Thompson, Silver Medal recipient at the 2008 Beijing Olympics, Women's Saber Team
 Cathy Turner, short track speed skater, winner of gold medals at the 1992 and 1994 Winter Olympics
Roland Williams, American football player, played in Super Bowl XXXIV for the St. Louis Rams

Old campus

New campus

References

External links

Rochester City School District website

1903 establishments in New York (state)
Educational institutions established in 1903
High schools in Monroe County, New York
National Register of Historic Places in Rochester, New York
Public middle schools in New York (state)
Public high schools in New York (state)
School buildings on the National Register of Historic Places in New York (state)